State elections were held in the Free State of Prussia on 7 December 1924 to elect all 450 members of the Landtag of Prussia. The governing coalition of the Social Democratic Party, Centre Party, and German Democratic Party made minimal gains or losses, with most change happening amongst the opposition. The German National People's Party made significant gains, nearly surpassing the SPD as the largest party, while the Independent Social Democratic Party collapsed. The German People's Party also lost a portion of the gains it had made in the previous election. The National Socialist Freedom Party, a branch of the Nazi Party formed after the Beer Hall Putsch, won 2.5% of the vote and 11 seats.

Results

Results by constituency

See also
 Elections in the Free State of Prussia
 Weimar Republic

Notes

References

External Links

1924 elections in Germany
1924
December 1924 events